Project Hope may refer to:

 Project Hope, a public service project organized by the China Youth Development Foundation
 Project HOPE, a US philanthropic organization
 Project Hope Palestine, an international non-governmental organization in Palestine
 Project Hope (film), a 1961 short film
 Project Hope (Singapore), a televised national fund raising event in Singapore